The 2016 MTV Movie Awards were held on April 9, 2016, from Warner Brothers Studios in Burbank, California, as the first such event in 21 years, as well as being the first Movie Awards to be held outdoors. In addition, this year's awards also became the first since the 2006 MTV Movie Awards not to be aired live, as the event was pre-recorded on April 9 prior to its April 10 broadcast date, and the first since the 2003 MTV Movie Awards to include two hosts, instead of one.

Performers
 Halsey – "Castle"
 Dwayne Johnson, Kevin Hart, Adam DeVine, Anthony Mackie, and Rebel Wilson – "25th Anniversary Tribute Rap"
 Salt-N-Pepa – "Shoop"
 The Lonely Island – "Will Smith Medley"
 Ariana Grande – "Dangerous Woman"
a Salt-N-Pepa performed right before Ryan Reynolds accepted the award for Best Comedic Performance.

Presenters
 Miles Teller – presented Best Female Performance
 Keegan-Michael Key and Jordan Peele – presented Best Virtual Performance
 Chris Evans – presented exclusive clip to Captain America: Civil War
 Chris Hemsworth, Charlize Theron, and Jessica Chastain – introduced Halsey
 Jesse Eisenberg, Lizzy Caplan, and Woody Harrelson – presented Best Action Performance
 Common – introduced the MTV Movie Awards 25th anniversary tribute and Kendrick Lamar
 Kendrick Lamar – presented True Story
 Seth Rogen and Zac Efron – presented Best Comedic Performance
 Kevin Hart – introduced The Lonely Island
 Queen Latifah and Halle Berry – presented the MTV Generation Award
 Anna Kendrick, Zac Efron, and Adam DeVine – presented Best Breakthrough Performance
 Kendall Jenner and Gigi Hadid – introduced Ariana Grande
 Stephen Amell – presented Best Kiss
 Will Smith, Margot Robbie, Cara Delevingne, and Jared Leto – presented the exclusive trailer to Suicide Squad
 Dwayne Johnson and Kevin Hart – presented the Comedic Genius Award
 Emilia Clarke and Andy Samberg – presented Best Fight
 Eddie Redmayne – presented the teaser for Fantastic Beasts and Where to Find Them
 Alexander Skarsgård and Samuel L. Jackson – presented Movie of the Year

Films with multiple nominations

The following films received multiple nominations:

 Eleven – Star Wars: The Force Awakens
 Eight – Deadpool
 Six – Avengers: Age of Ultron
 Four – Mad Max: Fury Road, Pitch Perfect 2, The Revenant, Trainwreck
 Three – The Hunger Games: Mockingjay – Part 2, Jurassic World, Straight Outta Compton
 Two – Concussion, Creed, Fifty Shades of Grey, Furious 7, Joy, San Andreas, Spy.

Multiple winners
 Three – Star Wars: The Force Awakens
 Two – Pitch Perfect 2, Deadpool

Winners
The results were announced on April 9, 2016. Winners are listed first and highlighted in boldface.

MTV Generation Award
 Will Smith

Comedic Genius Award
 Melissa McCarthy

References

External links
 MTV Movie Awards official site
 Hollywoodreporter.com. MTV Movie Awards: The Complete Winners List

MTV Movie & TV Awards
MTV Movie Awards
MTV Movie Awards
2016 in Los Angeles
2016 in American cinema